Aetholix flavibasalis is a moth in the family Crambidae. It was described by Achille Guenée in 1854. It is found in Australia (Queensland), Thailand, western India, Sri Lanka, the Andamans and on Borneo.

The larvae feed on Garcinia mangostana and Eugenia species.

References

Moths described in 1854
Spilomelinae
Moths of Asia
Moths of Australia